Forest Hill is a suburb of Wagga Wagga, New South Wales. Forest Hill is located approximately 10 km east of the central business district on the Sturt Highway. RAAF Base Wagga, Wagga Wagga Airport and the Bureau of Meteorology Regional Office are located at Forest Hill.

Newer streets in Forest Hill are named after Australian trees.

References

External links 

Suburbs of Wagga Wagga